These are the results of the women's K-1 slalom competition in canoeing at the 1992 Summer Olympics. The K-1 (kayak single) event is raced by one-person kayaking through a whitewater course.  The venue for the 1992 Olympic competition was in La Seu d'Urgell.

Medalists

Results
The 26 competitors each took two runs through the whitewater slalom course on August 1. The best time of the two runs counted for the event.

References

1992 Summer Olympics official report Volume 5.  p. 152. 
1992 women's slalom K-1 results
Wallechinsky, David and Jaime Loucky (2008). "Canoeing: Women's Kayak Slalom Singles". In The Complete Book of the Olympics: 2008 Edition. London: Aurum Press Limited. pp. 495–6.

Women's Slalom K-1
Olympic
Women's events at the 1992 Summer Olympics